Kuranui College is a state co-educational secondary school for the South Wairarapa located in Greytown, New Zealand.  The college opened in February 1960 to replace the four district high schools in Greytown, Featherston, Martinborough, and Carterton. The college was built in Greytown, for it was the midpoint of the towns. In the midst of the post-World War II baby boom. It has been said to have as many as 900 students in the mid-1970s, but since the end of the baby boom, that number has dropped.

Then Education Minister Lockwood Smith disbanded the college's Board of Trustees due to it being dysfunctional. Brian Lochore was appointed commissioner after sacking of the board of trustees in 1994.
Board in-fighting had reached the stage where the students rebelled, staging a lunchtime student strike.
In 2005, Trevor Mallard visited Kuranui College due to the Wairarapa schools project, WELCom. He first announced the project at Kuranui College. The project aims to establish a 'virtual' secondary school community for the Tararua and Wairarapa region using broadband. Kuranui is one of 15 rural secondary schools in New Zealand with agricultural subjects in their curriculum. Kuranui is a busload college with over eighty per cent of the students who go to college travel to and from school daily by bus.

The college serves Years 9 to 13; the college has a roll of  students as of

History

Origins 1950-1959

Prior to the establishment of Kuranui, secondary education in the South Wairarapa was catered for by the local district high schools in the four towns. As early as 1950, the Greytown School Committee and Wellington Education Board members were discussing methods of fulfilling this need. In July 1952, a meeting of school committees and parent-teacher associations asked the Wellington Education Board to establish a post-primary school in South Wairarapa. The department proceeded with the request to establish a post-primary school. During the succeeding months, the location of the new college was the subject of much discussion, and though Greytown and Featherston agreed to the disestablishment of the local high schools, In July 1958, the Cabinet Works Committee approved the preparation of plans. By September 1959, Sam Meads had been appointed principal. The name "Kuranui" was selected by the Committee of Management at its inaugural meeting in Greytown District High School on September 19, 1959.  Kuranui in the Māori language means "large school" (kura = school, education, learning gathering + nui = to be large, big), describing the aspect it was formed from three former high schools, and also being a secondary school ("bigger" than a primary school.)

 A new college 1960-1969 
On the 1st of February 1960, twenty-two staff met together for the first time. The next day, the whole school assembled in the hospital paddock. When the college was first opened in 1960, it taught children at the primary school level as well as children at the secondary level. The official opening of the college wasn't done until a year later, in 1961, by Lord Cobham, who was Governor-General at the time. In 1962 the drama class did Trial by Jury.  The college produced a recording of the play on a 10-inch LP with the label "His Master's Voice Process Recording." The drama class also did the opera Lolanthe in 1966 with the same recording company. This led to a sequence of Gilbert and Sullivan operas in the first few years such as The Gondoliers, The Mikado  and The Yeomen of the Guard.  

 Crest 
The crest represents the Wairarapa. The two white arrows represent the peaks of the mountain ranges. The blue with white zigzags represent Lake Wairarapa with the sun shining on the lake, and below the crest is the school motto, Tatau Tatau. 

 Reunions 
The first reunion was held in April 1985 for the college's Silver Jubilee. Next was Easter 2000, from April 21–23, for the 40th anniversary. In 2010, the college had its Golden Jubilee over the Easter weekend. Some of the events of the reunion included entertainment from the college's dance group and the kapa haka group. A museum was also set up in the auditorium, where old photos of the college, uniforms, and memorabilia were displayed. A 60th anniversary celebration was held at the college. 113 students out of the original 450 came to the event. At the end of the day, a cherry tree was dug up for the future students of the college to sit under.

 Controversies 
In 2009, a year 13 student pleaded guilty to possessing cannabis. He was also giving it out to his flower students in the playground of the college. His family withdrew him from the college.

In 2010, four year 13 Kuranui College students were in a high-speed crash. The car they were driving ended upside-down in a ditch. They were taken to Wairarapa Hospital. All of them survived the cash. Two of the students had severed their spinal cords. The driver of the car was to do 320 hours of community work. The car crashed about 1:40 p.m. on Monday on rural Papawai Road in Greytown. Seven students, in two cars, had left school without permission. The police said they suspected the two cars had been racing.

One of the teachers had a series of complaints that she repeatedly swore during class and called out insults at her students. She taught at Kuranui College for 12 years, between 2004 and 2016. It was reported that she had told a group of students during a session that if they were going to refuse to sing, "you can f**k off back to class." In September 2010, she was reported for occasionally referring to her students as "wankers" or "sluts" (no formal action was taken on that matter). In 2014, she was given her final warning after an angry outburst that saw her tell students to "shut the f**k up." She also was said to have told a Year 9 student classmate that he was "being a dick" to the rest of the class. After the complaints, she was found guilty of serious misconduct and was struck off the register.

In April 2015, a cleaner was found dead on the college grounds. He started working at the college back in 2011. There were no suspicious circumstances involved in the death.

 Sport and cultural activities 
 Art 
A student at the college and her art was featured at Massey University Creative Arts book Exposure in 2012 for her use of contemporary setting and parody of Disney stereotypes.

In 2021, students did an art project to construct outdoor artworks that have been displayed at the front of the college by putting the artworks on the outside walls of the visual art classroom.

 Dance 
At the Wellington ASB 2014 Stage Challenge. Kuranui College placed third in the open division and won the Thomas George McCarthy Trust Award of Excellence for Choreography.

The college contemporary dance team placed 3rd in the Dance NZ Made national finals in Palmerston North 2020. This is the second time Kuranui has placed in the top three at the national level since 2016.

The school came in first place in the national stage performance competition Showquest 2021 with a dance based on the Waikeria Prison uprising. This is the first time Kuranui has come away with a national title, having been placed 2nd in the 2019 competition.

 Drama 
In 2008, the college was the winner of the student-directed scene for the Wairarapa Sheila Winn Shakespeare Festival.

At the 2019 SGCNZ National Shakespeare Festival Kuranui College sets its take on Richard III at the time of the New Zealand wars. Kuranui came to the festival having had three students in the past five years make it to the Globe in London. They won 4 Awards for the play. At the 2020 SGCNZ National Shakespeare Festival Kuranui College took out four major awards for their 15-minute scene from King John This was the sixth consecutive year that the college has represented Wairarapa, qualifying for the national finals after winning the regional competition.

 Music 
In 2016, the senior rock band Simplicity represented the college at the regionals of the Smokefree Rockquest competition, picking up the People's Choice Award. In 2021, Kuranui College students came away with several top music awards at the regional finals of Smokefree Rockquest. Includes first place in the Solo/Duo category, then second place in the Band category and a place at Nationals.

 Maths 
Since 2015, students have been to Wairarapa College for the "Matharapa" competitions. Each team of three pupils competes in three phases of competition over two hours. The teams comprise individuals or groups. The college took firsts in the Year 9 and Year 10 levels.

 Film 

In 2022, a 40-minute short film produced on location in the Wairarapa and written, directed, and starring a group of Kuranui College students. In 2021, a student won best Editor and Best Sound Mix for ONSCREEN. A nationwide short-film challenge for high school students.

 Sports 
One of the students at the college earned first place in Rookie of the Year title in 2010. In the nationwide rodeo competitions. The event she won the title in was Barrel racing.

At the Wairarapa inter-collegiate track and field championships held at Makoura College in 2012. Two records were broken. The shot put events provided a record broken, from a student at the college with a put of 12.22m in the junior boy's section and a record in the intermediate boy's triple jump with a distance of 12.40m.

The college's Football team won the 2014 Wairarapa Secondary school division one title. The boys 1st XI Football team won the Wairarapa Secondary School A grand in 2015.

At the 2016 Rosemary O'Brien Cup the Girls 1st XI Hockey team made the finals at the Rosemary O'Brien national hockey tournament in 2016 the game was held at Palmerston North. In the finals, Kuranui played Feilding High School the score was 6 to Feilding and 0 to Kuranui.

Every year, Kuranui and Tararua College have a traditional annual sports exchange. It was started by former Kuranui Principal Grey Tuck and they play for the Bailey Family Trophy. In 2017, 200 students took part in various sports as part of the Tararua College exchanged. Out of the seven sports codes, Kuranui won five of them and got to keep the Bailey Family Trophy. Kuranui also won it in 2018. For the 2019 exchange it was a draw so Kuranui was allowed to retain the trophy for another year. In September 2020, Kuranui won the Trophy after a 3–3 draw. Six Kuranui sports teams travelled to the Pahiatua Sports Complex to compete.

The college Sport Wellington Regional Athletics was held at Newtown Park in 2019. The college competed in the annual event and won the junior boys' triple jump to set a new record. At the same event in 2020, the same students came in 2nd.

In 2021, the school hosted the first e-sports exchange in Wairarapa; they played against Wairarapa College. It was a draw..

 Prank 
In 2014, students at the college put a "For Sale – Kuranui College" advertising sign at the school's entrance. The sign invited offers for the college, fooling teachers as well as other students. The sign is a prank, in keeping with the annual tradition of Year-13 students playing jokes on their last day of school before heading off on study leave.

 Facilities 

 Map 

 The Nelson blocks 
Like many secondary schools in New Zealand of the era, Kuranui was built to the New Zealand standard school buildings, based on two-storey H-shaped "Nelson blocks", of which three were built at Kuranui and only one of them which still stands today, E-Block . C-Block was demolished in 2010, followed by B-Block in 2015, which had stood since 1959.

 Building new rooms 
In 2000, the college built a three-quarter turf.  New temporary classrooms have been added to the college located on the western and southern sides of Tararua (previously E-Block) and has formed Papawai Block (P-Block). The classrooms at Kuranui College would remain open for up to five years while the ministry plans a permanent block. A new suite of seven science and math classrooms was completed in 2012 as part of a NZ$1.8 million rebuild. More development work, including the demolition of B-Block and the construction of new visual arts classrooms in 2017, was completed.

 Updating rooms 
From the day the college was opened until 1970, about NZ$337,399 was spent on the total cost of exterior building maintenance. During 2000, the college completed the upgrading of the college library and staffroom. From 1997 to 2000, the college spent in excess of NZ$500,000 repainting and modernising existing buildings. The school gyms, originally built in 1961, were extended in 1997 with the addition of a classroom, seating area, and climbing area. The school is planning to rebuild the gym, as it is no longer fit for purpose. The total cost of rebuilding is estimated to be upwards of NZ$5.5 million. Piri Weepu supports the plan for the rebuilding the gym. The South Wairarapa District Council has agreed to sign off on a NZ$1 million grant for the gymnasium project. Kuranui College and the Ministry of Education will foot the rest of the approximately NZ$5.5 million bill. There will be a running costs for the facilities themselves and finance costs. The estimate is for the running costs to be NZ$43,000 and the finance costs to be NZ$239,000. The loan is for over 25 years. In 2009, the college was inline for a NZ$2 million grant from the government to demolish C-Block and update the buildings. A letter was sent to Kuranui School advising them that they had been given the NZ$2 million grant. However, the college had been confused with a primary school of the same name (Kuranui School). The Education Minister at the time, Anne Tolley, had complained that the letter was sent to the wrong school. In 2013, the college spent approximately NZ$7,000 on installing security cameras in part of the college, but doing so throughout the entire college will cost upwards of NZ$40,000.  The college library was getting weather-tightness remediation, internal refurbishment, and roof replacement. The work involved the demolition and rebuilding of the front entrance, front desk, computer room, and book rooms of the library. Construction for it started in mid-December 2020. Refurbishments were made to T-Block in 2018–2019; work included painting the exterior of the building, replacing internal wall linings, and installing temperature control systems.

 Curriculum 

 Base 6 
Base 6 was a Kuranui programme back in 2001. The Base 6 project grew out of a process of college self-improvement. The principal, the board of trustees, and the management team made a decision to focus on elevating student achievement and learning expectations. The Board of Trustees contracted education consultant David Hood as a project facilitator. His primary task at Kuranui was to work with the Board of Trustees, school management, and staff to establish an environment in which people worked together on common issues.
Hood initially spent several weeks talking with staff individually to identify their issues. Asking teachers to talk about their beliefs about learning at Kuranui. This gave Hood a picture of teacher strengths and possible outcomes from the process of staff consultation.
College staff were then asked to contribute their thoughts on particular projects that would help the college meet its goals and objectives, with a focus on improving the quality of learning. Eleven project briefs were developed and submitted, as well as a plan for classroom upgrades. The change management group felt that many of the proposals should be subsumed under two main new initiatives, one focused on the junior school and the other on the senior school. The junior school project, which eventually grew to be Base 6.
The first step for the junior school project team was to develop a mission statement that outlined the goals. In the process of development, the Kuranui College's Change Management Group had determined that the junior school project would be developed around thematic approaches to studying in a home-room setting. Exploration of thematic learning approaches led the project team to curriculum integration. So the project team's first step was to figure out what curriculum integration would mean for them.
 Both Years 9 and 10 combined national achievement objectives from all curricula, where learning is structured around research and students taking responsibility for their learning. The programme was named after the six main features of Base 6: learning through inquiry, independent student-centred learning, authentic contexts, collaborative learning, ICT-enhanced learning, and the building of connections to family. The programme took place for 19 periods per fortnight. The remaining 9 periods were continued to be used for the usual options and programmes. Base 6 students work with the other Year 9 or 10 students during these periods. The students were to collect and keep evidence for a portfolio that was intended to be stored online. Students who choose not to enter Base 6 are taught in conventional subject classes. It was officially opened on Friday 23 March 2001. However, in 2018, Kuranui College introduced a curriculum known as Ignite to replace Base 6.

 Ignite 
Ignite was implemented at Kuranui in 2018 for junior students (years 9–10) and then for senior students (years 11–13) in 2021. The Ignite program gives students more choice over their subjects, with each student choosing ten courses (subjects) each year. The courses are split into categories based on the subject they teach, with each course focusing on a particular aspect or passion that students may enjoy. The Ignite program is meant to increase engagement in the classroom and, therefore, results. The year is divided into two semesters, which are each approximately 18 weeks long. Students study five courses each semester, totalling ten each year. Students have the choice of up to 24 courses over two years before becoming senior students in years 11–13. The senior Ignite students will be able to choose five courses per semester. Students could choose up to 10 courses in a year, or five courses if they took two semesters of each subject. For students completing NCEA L1 the courses they choose must include at least 10 literacy and 10 numeracy credits to complete the year.

 Inspire time 
In 2020, a new initiative called Inspire time was announced along with the new weekly timetable structure. The programme provided two dedicated weekly sessions in the new timetable. Both junior and senior students can select two courses each term. The purpose of inspire time is to allow for non-curricular activities focused on pathway development for students. This also allowed for mixed classrooms. Inspire time happens on Tuesday and Thursday from 12.30 p.m. to 1.30 p.m. During December 2020, Kuranui College received NZ$22,112 for the programme from the Greytown Trust Lands.

 Academics 
As a state school, Kuranui College is required to follow the New Zealand Curriculum (NZC).

 Results 

 Enrolment 

Education Counts provided the following statistics as of July 1, 2022: The school had 748 students enrolled, of whom 54.01 percent were male and 45.99 percent were female. There were 476 students identified as European/Pākeha, 214 identified as Māori, 21 as Pacific, 25 as Asian, and 12 as another ethnicity. In 2020, the college recorded its biggest increase in Year 9 student enrolments for over a decade, a 38% increase.

 Houses 
The school has four houses, which form classes are assigned to, which are named after important places or features of the Wairarapa, and each is represented by a native bird and tree. They are Ruamahanga with the Pūkeko and Hīnau; Aorangi with the Tūī and kowhai; Tararua with the Kererū, and Rātā and Wairarapa with the Toroa and Ngaio. Throughout the year, a series of inter-house sporting and cultural competitions are held that earn points towards top house.

The Kuranui College houses and their colours and eponyms are:

 Principals 
Since its establishment in 1960, Kuranui College has had six principals. The following is a complete list:

 Notable people 
 Students 

 Since it was founded, Kuranui College alumni have made significant and creative contributions to society, the arts, sciences and business. Notable Kuranui College students include:

 Max Abbott – psychologist
 Grant Batty – rugby union player
 Penny Bright – political activist
 Dave Cameron - musician
 John Cornes – rugby union player
 Jimmy Cotter – rugby union player and softballer
 Martin Edmond – writer
 Mike Fabulous – musician
 Bernadette Logue – author
 Elizabeth McKinley – educational theorist
 Vincent Ward – filmmaker

 Notable staff or members of the board of trustees 
 Georgina Beyer – politician.
 Cathy Casey – politician
 Allan Hunter – rugby union player and teacher
 Tom Hullena - educator 
 Belinda Cordwell – tennis player
 Michael Jackson – anthropologist 
 Brian Lochore – rugby union player and coach.
 Albert Wendt – writer

 See also 

 List of schools in New Zealand
 Education in New Zealand

 References 
 Notes 
 Citations 
 Bibliography Not by author; sorted by publication name''
 
 
 
 
 
 
 
 
 
 
 
 
 
 
 
 
 
 
 
 
 
 

Online sources
 
 
 

Dissertations & Theses
 

Primary sources

External links 
 School website
 Education Review Office reports

Secondary schools in the Wellington Region
Educational institutions established in 1960
Schools in the Wairarapa
New Zealand secondary schools of Nelson plan construction
1960 establishments in New Zealand
Greytown, New Zealand